Michael Fitzgerald (born 1961) is an American businessman and former professional race car driver. He is the current chief executive officer (CEO) of Acero Precision. 

As a race car driver, he participated in Historic Formula One Series between 2004 and 2012 and won races in Belgium, England, and Montreal.

Early life and career
Born in 1961 in Havertown, Pennsylvania, Fitzgerald studied mechanical engineering at Drexel University. During his time as an engineering student, he used to work on computer numeric control machine and was developed interest in autoracing.

In 1985, Fitzgerald founded Acero Precision. 

In 2001, Fitzgerald won Historic Grand Prix du Canada. 

In 2008, Fitzgerald participated in the Historic Grand Prix of Monaco and attained third place. His team, Highcroft Racing won American Le Mans Series championship in 2009 and 2010. Three years later, in 2011, he won the Grand Prix du Canada with Williams FW08.

References

Living people
1961 births
Drexel University alumni
American racing drivers
People from Haverford Township, Pennsylvania
Racing drivers from Pennsylvania
Racing drivers from Philadelphia
Sportspeople from Philadelphia